A tabletop runway is a runway that is located on the top of a plateau or hill with one or both ends adjacent to a steep precipice which drops into a deep gorge. This type of runway creates an optical illusion of being at the same level as the plains below, which requires a very precise visual approach by the pilot when autoland is not used or is not available at all.

List of tabletop runways

Selected accidents and incidents
 On 19 November 1977, TAP Air Portugal Flight 425, a Boeing 727-200, landed long on runway in Madeira Airport, plunged over a steep bank and then crashed hard onto a beach. 131 people on board were killed in this accident but the runway was dramatically extended and got several upgrades in the following decades.
 The configuration of Mangalore Airport has been cited as a factor in the Air India Express Flight 812 crash on 22 May 2010. The Boeing 737 Air India Express flight involved overshot the runway threshold touchdown area, failed to stop, went out of control, and rolled down a steep hillside.
 On 25 May 2011, an Embraer Phenom 100, N224MD, operated by JetSuite overran the runway during landing at the Sedona Airport. The pilots approached with an excessive airspeed, which resulted in a failure to stop the airplane before overrunning the runway. The first officer and one passenger suffered serious injuries.
The cargo flight descended too low on approach, upon which pilots suddenly increased the angle of attack at the low speed. The aircraft stalled as a result of excessive drag and impacted the sloppy terrain  short of the runway.
 On 7 August 2020, an Air India Express Flight 1344 Boeing 737 (as part of Vande Bharat Mission) skidded off the tabletop runway at Calicut International Airport in Kerala with 19 fatalities including the captain and co-pilot.

References

Airport infrastructure